Onomarchus uninotatus is a species of katydid from the genus Onomarchus. The species was originally described by Jean Guillaume Audinet-Serville in 1838.

References

External links

Taxa named by Jean Guillaume Audinet-Serville
Pseudophyllinae